Theopea is a genus of skeletonizing leaf beetles in the family Chrysomelidae. There are more than 25 described species in Theopea. They are found in Indomalaya and the Palearctic. It is closely related to the genera Pseudotheopea and Borneotheopea.

Species
These 28 species belong to the genus Theopea, divided into three species groups (with nine others considered as species incertae sedis):

Theopea impressa group:
 Theopea chungi Lee & Bezdĕk, 2019
 Theopea impressa (Fabricius, 1801)
 Theopea longicollis (Jacoby, 1896)
 Theopea louwerensi Jolivet, 1951
 Theopea lunduensis Mohamedsaid, 1998

Theopea flavipalpis group:
 Theopea flavipalpis Laboissiere, 1940
 Theopea guoi Lee & Bezdĕk, 2019
 Theopea lui Lee & Bezdĕk, 2019
 Theopea sabahensis Lee & Bezdĕk, 2019

Theopea pulchella group:
 Theopea bicolor Kimoto, 1989
 Theopea bicoloroides Lee & Bezděk, 2020
 Theopea elegantula Baly, 1864
 Theopea fairmairei Duvivier, 1885
 Theopea houjayi Lee & Bezdĕk, 2019
 Theopea kedenburgi Weise, 1922
 Theopea mouhoti Baly, 1864
 Theopea pulchella Baly, 1864
 Theopea tsoui Lee & Bezdĕk, 2019
 Theopea yuae Lee & Bezdĕk, 2019

Species incertae sedis:
 Theopea clypeata Jacoby, 1896
 Theopea dohrni (Jacoby, 1889)
 Theopea incostata (Allard, 1889)
 Theopea intermedia (Jacoby, 1889)
 Theopea modiglianii Jacoby, 1896
 Theopea obliterata Jacoby, 1884
 Theopea variabilis (Jacoby, 1887)
 Theopea viridipennis (Jacoby, 1899)
 Theopea weberi (Weise, 1913)

References

Galerucinae
Chrysomelidae genera
Beetles of Asia
Taxa named by Joseph Sugar Baly